Seth George (born March 30, 1976 in Mission Viejo, California) is a retired American soccer player who spent three seasons in Major League Soccer.

Career

Youth
George had an outstanding youth soccer career, beginning with his club team, Huntington Beach Futbol Club. In 1992, George and his team mates won the U.S. U-16 national championship, the DJ Niotis Cup.  He then played soccer at Santa Margarita High School in Rancho Santa Margarita, California. In 1995, he was the Orange County Offensive MVP.

In 1995, he entered college at UCLA, and played four seasons with the men's soccer team. In 1997 the Bruins went to the NCAA Men's Soccer Championship game against the Virginia Cavaliers. George scored both goals in the UCLA's 2-0 victory. He was named the tournament's offensive MVP and was selected as a second team All American. In 1998, he was named a first team All American, ending his college career in 1998 with 49 goals in 86 games.

Professional
In 1999, George was drafted in the first round of the United Soccer League's draft by the San Diego Flash, and was also drafted by the Los Angeles Galaxy in the second round (thirteenth overall) of the 1999 MLS College Draft. George chose not to sign with either team, and instead moved to Europe, signing a contract with 1860 Munich in the Bundesliga. When it became apparent that he would not find first team playing time in Germany, George returned to the United States and signed with Galaxy.  Over two seasons, he appeared in twenty-three games, most as a late game substitute. In 2000, he went on loan with the Orange County Zodiac with the USL A-League.  The Galaxy waived him on November 2, 2000.  
A few days later, the Chicago Fire selected George in the waiver draft, but he never played a league game with them, and retired at the end of the 2001 season.

Post-Retirement
Since retiring from professional competition, George has continued to play on an amateur and semi-professional basis. In 2005, he was the team MVP for the Phoenix Croatians.

References

1976 births
Living people
American soccer players
American expatriate soccer players
UCLA Bruins men's soccer players
TSV 1860 Munich II players
LA Galaxy players
Orange County Blue Star players
MLS Pro-40 players
Chicago Fire FC players
A-League (1995–2004) players
Major League Soccer players
Sportspeople from Mission Viejo, California
Expatriate footballers in Germany
Soccer players from California
LA Galaxy draft picks
All-American men's college soccer players
Association football forwards
NCAA Division I Men's Soccer Tournament Most Outstanding Player winners